The Lithuanian Hall, also known as Lith Hall,  is the home of the Lithuanian Hall Association.  It is a private club located on Hollins Street in the Hollins Market neighborhood of Baltimore, Maryland and serves as a recreation center and meeting house for social events, including dance nights, musical events, community suppers and cultural events.  The hall was founded to serve the needs of the Lithuanian community in Baltimore, Maryland.  The hall is popular with artists and hipsters.

History
The hall was established in 1921, and was only referred to by the Lithuanian name Lietuvių Namai until 1968.

During the 1920s the hall was provided as a venue for speeches by prominent members of the Communist Party USA, such as William Z. Foster and Juliet Stuart Poyntz.  On October 13, 1929, a Jewish branch of the CPUSA hosted a speech by Sol Hurwitz, the editor of the Jewish Daily Forward, and the speech was interrupted by a mob of anti-Communists. The Communists defended themselves with chairs until the police arrived to disperse the mob.

References

External links
Baltimore Lithuanian-American Community website
Blog for Lithuanians in Baltimore
Image of the Hall
Image of Lith Hall from The Baltimore Sun
Official webpage
Website for Lithuanian folk dancing group based at Lith Hall
With booze and politics, Lithuanian Hall marks its 100th anniversary, The Baltimore Sun

1917 establishments in Maryland
Clubs and societies in the United States
Communism in Maryland
Communist Party USA
Dance venues in the United States
Drinking establishments in Maryland
Hipster (contemporary subculture)
History of Baltimore
Hollins Market, Baltimore
Lithuanian-American culture in Baltimore
Music venues in Baltimore
Organizations based in Baltimore
Organizations established in 1917
Union Square, Baltimore